The Parts of Holland is a historical division of Lincolnshire, England, encompassing the south-east of the county. The name is still recognised locally and survives in the district of South Holland.

Administration

Parts of Holland was one of the three medieval divisions, called 'Parts', of Lincolnshire (the other two being Lindsey and Kesteven) which had long had separate county administrations (quarter sessions).  Under the Local Government Act 1888 it obtained a county council, which it retained until 1974.  At that point the three county councils were abolished and Lincolnshire (minus the northern part of Lindsey, which formed part of Humberside) had a single county council for the first time.

Before the changes of 1888, Holland had, since probably the tenth century, been divided into the three wapentakes of Elloe, Kirton and Skirbeck.

Under the Local Government Act 1894, the administrative county of Holland was divided into rural districts and urban districts, with the municipal borough of Boston remaining untouched.  The rural districts were Boston, Crowland, East Elloe and Spalding, whilst Holbeach, Long Sutton, Spalding and Sutton Bridge became urban districts.

Geography

The geographical extent of the former Holland County Council is the same as that of the combined modern local government districts of Boston and South Holland.

Holland is all close to sea level, achieving a maximum altitude of about five metres (16 feet) on artificially raised river banks (levees). It therefore needed carefully managed drainage to maintain the very productive arable farmland which covered almost its entire extent. Consequently, a significant part of its drainage for arable use had to await the introduction of steam pumping. Before the mid-19th century, it was a much more pastoral area, used for fattening livestock brought in from Scotland and northern England before it was driven to market in places like London. Many of the country roads are still called droves.

Towns and villages in Holland
 Boston
 Crowland
 Donington
 Swineshead
 Holbeach
 Long Sutton
 Spalding

There is a resemblance in landscape between the Parts of Holland and Holland, the region in the Netherlands, although their meanings are different.  Holland in England means "land of the hill spurs", although hill spurs are hardly obvious, while the Dutch Holland is derived from the Old Dutch term  ("wooded land"). Both Hollands have landscapes that are low lying and both are known for tulip growing.

See also
 Earl of Holland

References

External links
 Map of Holland on Wikishire
 https://web.archive.org/web/20071001030631/http://www.visionofbritain.org.uk/relationships.jsp?u_id=10041806

 
History of Lincolnshire
Geography of Lincolnshire
Local government in Lincolnshire
Administrative counties abolished in 1974